Saint Severus of Ravenna was a 4th-century Bishop of Ravenna who attended the Council of Sardica in 344. He was ordained as a bishop due to his personal virtue and because of "the sign of a dove". 

He was purported to be an example of not only a married priest, but a married archbishop.

In 836, his relics were relocated by Archbishop Otgar of Mainz (826–847) from Pavia, first to Mainz, Germany, and eventually to a predecessor building of St Severus' Church, Erfurt, where they were buried and still lie today. Severus is depicted in Justinian's mosaics in Saint Apollinaire in Classis, and his name is recorded in early martyrologies.

References

Year of birth unknown
340s deaths
4th-century Italian bishops
Christian saints
People from Ravenna